Tolna is an administrative county (comitatus or vármegye) in present Hungary as it was of the former Kingdom of Hungary. It lies in central Hungary, on the west bank of the river Danube. It shares borders with the Hungarian counties Somogy, Fejér, Bács-Kiskun, and Baranya. The capital of Tolna county is Szekszárd. Its area is 3703 km2.

History

Tolna (in Latin: comitatus Tolnensis) was also the name of a historic administrative county (comitatus) of the Kingdom of Hungary. Its territory, which was about the same as that of present Tolna county, is now in central Hungary. The capital of the county was Szekszárd.

Demographics

Ethnicity
Besides the Hungarian majority, the main minorities are the Germans (approx. 10,000) and Roma (8,500).

Total population (2011 census): 230,361
Ethnic groups (2011 census):
Identified themselves: 214 953 persons:
Hungarians: 194 685 (90,57%)
Germans: 10 195 (4,74%)
Roma: 8 768 (4,08%)
Others and indefinable: 1 305 (0,61%)
Approx. 32,000 persons in Tolna County did not declare their ethnic group at the 2011 census.

Religion

Religious adherence in the county according to 2011 census:

Catholic – 108,755 (Roman Catholic – 108,392; Greek Catholic – 331)
Reformed – 18,533;
Evangelical – 6,800;
Other religions – 2,734; 
Non-religious – 35,803; 
Atheism – 2,194;
Undeclared – 55,542.

Regional structure

Politics 
The Tolna County Council, elected at the 2014 local government elections, is made up of 15 counselors, with the following party composition:

Presidents of the General Assembly

Municipalities 
Tolna County has 1 urban county, 10 towns, 5 large villages and 93 villages.

City with county rights
(ordered by population, as of 2011 census)
  Szekszárd (34,296) – county seat

Towns

  Paks (19,369)
  Dombóvár (19,010)
  Bonyhád (13,630)
  Tolna (11,126)
  Dunaföldvár (8,775)
  Tamási (8,349)
  Bátaszék (6,370)
  Simontornya (4,057)
  Nagymányok (2,338)
  Gyönk (2,052)

Villages

 Alsónána
 Alsónyék
 Aparhant
 Attala
 Báta
 Bátaapáti
 Belecska
 Bikács
 Bogyiszló
 Bonyhádvarasd
 Bölcske
 Cikó
 Csibrák
 Csikóstőttős
 Dalmand
 Decs 
 Diósberény
 Döbrököz
 Dunaszentgyörgy
 Dúzs
 Értény
 Fadd 
 Fácánkert
 Felsőnána
 Felsőnyék
 Fürged
 Gerjen
 Grábóc
 Györe
 Györköny
 Gyulaj
 Harc
 Hőgyész 
 Iregszemcse
 Izmény
 Jágónak
 Kajdacs
 Kakasd
 Kalaznó
 Kapospula
 Kaposszekcső
 Keszőhidegkút
 Kéty
 Kisdorog
 Kismányok
 Kisszékely
 Kistormás
 Kisvejke
 Kocsola
 Koppányszántó
 Kölesd
 Kurd
 Lápafő
 Lengyel
 Madocsa
 Magyarkeszi
 Medina
 Miszla
 Mórágy
 Mőcsény
 Mucsfa
 Mucsi
 Murga
 Nagydorog 
 Nagykónyi
 Nagyszékely
 Nagyszokoly
 Nagyvejke
 Nak
 Németkér
 Ozora
 Őcsény
 Pálfa
 Pári
 Pincehely 
 Pörböly
 Pusztahencse
 Regöly
 Sárpilis
 Sárszentlőrinc
 Sióagárd
 Szakadát
 Szakály
 Szakcs
 Szálka
 Szárazd
 Szedres
 Tengelic
 Tevel
 Tolnanémedi
 Udvari
 Újireg
 Varsád
 Váralja
 Várdomb
 Várong
 Závod
 Zomba

 municipalities are large villages.

Gallery

References

External links
 Official site in Hungarian and German
 Tolnai Népújság (teol.hu) - The county portal

 
Counties of Hungary